Moodna bisinuella is a species of snout moth in the genus Moodna. It was described by George Hampson in 1901 and is known from Mexico (including Orizaba, the type location).

References

Moths described in 1901
Phycitinae